Olfactory receptor 51E1 is a protein that in humans is encoded by the OR51E1 gene.

Olfactory receptors interact with odorant molecules in the nose, to initiate a neuronal response that triggers the perception of a smell. The olfactory receptor proteins are members of a large family of G-protein-coupled receptors arising from single coding-exon genes. Olfactory receptors share a 7-transmembrane domain structure with many neurotransmitter and hormone receptors and are responsible for the recognition and G protein-mediated transduction of odorant signals. The olfactory receptor gene family is the largest in the genome. The nomenclature assigned to the olfactory receptor genes and proteins for this organism is independent of other organisms.

Ligands
The receptor is associated with some compounds with a "cheese" or "sour" scent note.
Examples of compounds that activate OR51E1 include:
 butyl butyryl lactate
 isovaleric acid
 nonanoic acid
 3-methylpentanoic acid
 4-methylpentanoic acid
The following are in decreasing order of activity:
 butyric acid
 methyl eugenol
 methyl salicylate
 (+)-menthol
 eugenyl acetate
 2,4-dinitrotoluene
 pyrazine
 dimethyl disulfide
 methyl furfuryl disulfide
 pentanol
 propanal

See also 
 Olfactory receptor

References

Further reading

External links 
 

Olfactory receptors